This is a list of the legality of muscimol mushrooms by country.

References

Drug control law
Drug policy by country
Amanita mushrooms
Lists by country
Psychoactive fungi